Vinh Thanh may refer to several populated places in Vietnam:

Vĩnh Thạnh District, Cần Thơ, a rural district of Cần Thơ
Vĩnh Thạnh District, Bình Định, a rural district of Bình Định Province

Vĩnh Thanh
 Vĩnh Thanh, Kiên Giang, a ward of Rạch Giá
 Vĩnh Thanh, Bạc Liêu, a commune of Phước Long District, Bạc Liêu
 Vĩnh Thanh, Đồng Nai, a commune of Nhơn Trạch District

Vĩnh Thành
Vĩnh Thành, An Giang, a commune of Châu Thành District
Vĩnh Thành, Bến Tre, a commune of Chợ Lách District
Vĩnh Thành, Quảng Trị, a commune of Vĩnh Linh District
Vĩnh Thành, Thanh Hóa, a commune of Vĩnh Lộc District
Vĩnh Thành, Nghệ An, a commune of Yên Thành District
Vĩnh Thành, Sóc Trăng, a commune of Thạnh Trị District

Vĩnh Thạnh
Vĩnh Thạnh, Cần Thơ, a township and capital of Vĩnh Thạnh District, Cần Thơ
Vĩnh Thạnh, Bình Định, a township and capital of Vĩnh Thạnh District, Bình Định Province
Vĩnh Thạnh, Khánh Hòa, a commune of Nha Trang
Vĩnh Thạnh, Kiên Giang, a commune of Giồng Riềng District
Vĩnh Thạnh, Đồng Tháp, a commune of Lấp Vò District
Vĩnh Thạnh, Long An, a commune of Tân Hưng District

See also
Vĩnh Thạnh Trung, a commune in Châu Phú District